The 1904–05 Challenge Cup was the 9th staging of rugby league's oldest knockout competition, the Challenge Cup.

Warrington, the previous year's beaten finalists,  won the Cup at their third attempt.

Qualifier

First round

Second round

Quarterfinals

Semifinals

Final
The final was contested by Warrington and Hull Kingston Rovers at Headingley in Leeds on Saturday 29 April 1905, in front of a crowd of 19,638. Warrington beat Hull KR 6–0.

References

External links
Challenge Cup official website 
Challenge Cup 1904/05 results at Rugby League Project

Challenge Cup
Challenge Cup